Adi Ignatius (born in Burbank, California) is editor-in-chief of Harvard Business Review. He joined the magazine in January 2009.

Biography
Previously, he was deputy managing editor for Time, where he was responsible for many of its special editions, including the Person of the Year and Time 100 franchises. Previously, Ignatius served as Time's executive editor starting in 2002, responsible for the magazine's business and international coverage. He wrote frequently for the magazine, including cover stories on Google and the 2007 Person of the Year profile of Russian leader Vladimir Putin. Ignatius joined Time as Deputy Editor of Time Asia in 1996, based in Hong Kong, and was named Editor of that edition in 2000.

Prior to joining Time, Ignatius worked for many years at the Wall Street Journal, serving as the newspaper's bureau chief in Beijing and later in Moscow. He later served as managing editor of the Central European Economic Review and business editor of the Far Eastern Economic Review, publications owned by Dow Jones.

Ignatius was awarded a Zuckerman Fellowship at Columbia University’s School of International and Public Affairs (SIPA) in 1990. He received a bachelor's degree in history in 1981 from Haverford College in Pennsylvania. He is a member of the Council on Foreign Relations and the Asia Society and sits on the advisory board of the journalism school at SUNY.

His father, Paul Ignatius, served as United States Secretary of the Navy from 1967 to 1969. His brother, David Ignatius, is an editor and columnist for The Washington Post.

Books
Ignatius is coeditor, of the book Prisoner of the State: The Secret Journal of Premier Zhao Ziyang. The book is based on audiotapes that Zhao Ziyang, the former Premier of the People's Republic of China, recorded at home during 1999 and 2000.

In 2008, Ignatius was editor of the book President Obama: The Path to the White House, which was a ''New York Times Bestseller List bestseller.

References

External links

American male journalists
Time (magazine) people
1958 births
Living people
School of International and Public Affairs, Columbia University alumni
People from Burbank, California
Haverford College alumni